Ivan Dodig and Marcelo Melo were the defending champions, but chose not to participate together. Dodig teamed up with Rohan Bopanna, but lost in the quarterfinals to Melo who partnered Łukasz Kubot. Kubot and Melo lost in the semifinals to Jamie Murray and Bruno Soares.

Pierre-Hugues Herbert and Nicolas Mahut won the title, defeating Murray and Soares in the final, 7–6(8–6), 6–4.

By reaching the quarterfinals with John Peers, Henri Kontinen regained the ATP no. 1 doubles ranking from Melo at the end of the tournament.

Seeds
All seeds received a bye into the second round.

Draw

Finals

Top half

Bottom half

References
Main Draw

Men's Doubles